Yusuf Pasha could refer to the following Ottoman statesmen:

Sinanüddin Fakih Yusuf Pasha, grand vizier
Sinan Yusuf Pasha, Ottoman admiral
Cığalazade Yusuf Sinan Pasha, Ottoman admiral and grand vizier
Yusuf Sayfa Pasha, Ottoman governor of Tripoli Eyalet
Silahdar Yusuf Pasha, Ottoman admiral
Ağa Yusuf Pasha, grand vizier
Koca Yusuf Pasha, grand vizier
Kunj Yusuf Pasha, Ottoman governor of Damascus
Yusuf Karamanli, Ottoman pasha of Tripolitania
Yusuf Izzet Pasha, Ottoman army general
Yusuf Ziya Pasha, Ottoman ambassador to the United States